When Maine became a state on March 15, 1820, it was apportioned one seat in the United States House of Representatives for the remainder of the 16th United States Congress until March 3, 1821.  Starting with the 17th Congress, six more seats were reapportioned (moved, essentially) from Massachusetts and districts were established, thereby eliminating the at-large seat.

During the 48th Congress (1883–1885), Maine elected its four members of the United States House of Representatives at-large statewide, on a general ticket.

List of members representing the district

References

At-large
Former congressional districts of the United States
At-large United States congressional districts
Constituencies established in 1820
Constituencies disestablished in 1821
1820 establishments in Maine
1821 disestablishments in Maine
Constituencies established in 1883
Constituencies disestablished in 1885
1883 establishments in Maine
1885 disestablishments in Maine